Staroalexeyevka is a rural locality (a village) in Adzitarovsky Selsoviet, Karmaskalinsky District, Bashkortostan, Russia. The population was 25 as of 2010. There is 1 street.

Geography 
Staroalexeyevka is located 35 km southwest of Karmaskaly (the district's administrative centre) by road. Yakty-Yalan is the nearest rural locality.

References 

Rural localities in Karmaskalinsky District